Neolasioptera allioniae is a species of gall midges, insects in the family Cecidomyiidae.

References

Further reading

External links

 

Cecidomyiinae